The 2000 MTV Video Music Awards (stylized as MTV Video Music Awards vma.00) aired live on September 7, 2000, honoring the best music videos from June 12, 1999, to June 9, 2000. The show was hosted by Marlon and Shawn Wayans at Radio City Music Hall in New York City.

The 2000 show is best remembered for Tim Commerford of Rage Against the Machine climbing a piece of set scaffolding and refusing to come down after his band lost the award for Best Rock Video to Limp Bizkit. The show went to commercial while security removed Commerford, who was later arrested and forced to spend a night in jail.

Janet Jackson opened the show with her hit “Doesn’t Really Matter”.  Britney Spears performed her hit single "Oops!...I Did It Again" which went on to become one of the VMA's most iconic and controversial performances, due to her skin-colored performance attire. NSYNC also performed their hit single "Bye Bye Bye". Bizkit vocalist Fred Durst later joined Christina Aguilera onstage as a surprise guest during her performance of "Come On Over Baby (All I Want Is You)".

For the second year in a row DMX did not show up for dress rehearsals; as a result, Nelly's performance, originally scheduled for the pre-show, was promoted to the main event. Other highlights included Eminem performing amidst an army of "Slim Shady" lookalikes and a humorous montage dedicated to past VMA winners who had failed to repeat their previous success.

This was Aaliyah's last appearance at the VMA awards  before her death a year later in August 2001 in a plane crash in the Bahamas. She won her two and only VMA awards that night, for Best Female Video and Best Video from a Film for "Try Again".

Background
Nominees were announced at a news conference held on July 25 in MTV's Times Square studio. At the same news conference, Shawn and Marlon Wayans were announced as hosts, while *NSYNC and Rage Against the Machine were announced as performers. Janet Jackson was announced as a performer on August 3. Britney Spears and Eminem were announced as performers on August 7. DMX, Blink-182, and the Red Hot Chili Peppers were announced as performers on August 15. Christina Aguilera and Sisqó were announced as performers on August 28. The ceremony broadcast was preceded by the 2000 MTV Video Music Awards Opening Act. Hosted by Kurt Loder and Serena Altschul with reports from Chris Connelly, Brian McFayden, John Norris, and Iann Robinson, the broadcast featured red carpet interviews, pre-taped features on the rise of songs and music videos about butts (such as "Thong Song" and "Back That Thang Up"), Eminem's career over the past year, and music feuds, a sneak preview of the music video for U2's "Beautiful Day" (which would premiere on Total Request Live the following day), and performances from Papa Roach.

Performances

Presenters

Pre-show
 Kurt Loder and Serena Altschul – announced the winners of the professional categories, Breakthrough Video and Best Video from a Film

Main show
 Renée Zellweger – introduced Janet Jackson
 Dr. Dre and Steven Tyler – presented Best Group Video
 Kid Rock and The Rock – presented Best Dance Video
 U2 (Bono and Larry Mullen, Jr.) – introduced Rage Against the Machine
 Jimmy Fallon – appeared in a skit onstage about Viewer's Choice voting procedures
 Jakob Dylan and Kate Hudson – presented Best New Artist in a Video
 Venus and Serena Williams (via satellite) – introduced Sisqó
 Ricky Martin – presented Best Female Video
 Destiny's Child and Wyclef Jean – presented Best Male Video
 Carson Daly – introduced Napster creator Shawn Fanning and introduced Britney Spears with him
 Lenny Kravitz and Gisele Bündchen – presented Best Hip-Hop Video
 Method Man & Redman – appeared in a vignette about Viewer's Choice voting procedures
 LL Cool J and Macy Gray – presented Best Pop Video
 Jim Carrey – introduced Eminem
 Chris Rock and Lance Crouther (as "Pootie Tang") – presented the Video Vanguard Award and introduced the Red Hot Chili Peppers
 Moby and P!nk – presented Best Rap Video
 Aaliyah and Ananda Lewis – introduced NSYNC
 D'Angelo and Jennifer Lopez – presented Best Rock Video
 Toni Braxton and 98 Degrees – introduced the International Viewer's Choice Award winners
 Carson Daly - explained the Tim Commerford incident to viewers, interviewed Fred Durst and Kid Rock, and introduced Mark Wahlberg
 Mark Wahlberg – introduced Nelly
 Sting and Eve – presented Best R&B Video
 Ben Stiller and Robert De Niro – presented Best Direction in a Video
 Chyna and Richard Hatch – introduced Christina Aguilera
 Lil' Kim and Vincent Pastore – presented Viewer's Choice
 Christina Aguilera and Britney Spears – introduced Whitney Houston
 Whitney Houston and Bobby Brown – presented Video of the Year
 Lars Ulrich – introduced Blink-182 (and appeared in a taped skit about Napster earlier)

Winners and nominees
Winners are in bold text.

See also
2000 MTV Europe Music Awards

References

External links
 Official MTV site

2000
MTV Video Music Awards
MTV Video Music Awards
2000 in American music